Julien Maggiotti (born 9 September 1995) is a French professional footballer who plays as a midfielder for Laval, on loan from Charleroi.

Career
A youth product of Lucciana since the age of 5, Maggiotti began his senior career with the club in 2017. An amateur at Lucciana, Maggiotti worked as a ironworker on the side and weighed 103 kg while playing. A chance meeting with the former professional footballer Pascal Camadini convinced him to lose weight, and he gained attention as one of the most talented players on his team. He transferred to Cholet in the 2020-21 season. In 17 June 2021, he moved to Laval in the Championnat National. He helped them win the 2021–22 Championnat National and earn promotion into the Ligue 2, and was named the club's player of the season by the fans. On 21 June 2022, he transferred to the Belgium club Charleroi signing a 2+1 year deal, but immediately returned to Laval on loan for the 2022-23 season.

Honours
Laval
Championnat National: 2021–22

References

External links
 

1995 births
Living people
French footballers
French expatriate footballers
Sportspeople from Bastia
French people of Corsican descent
Association football midfielders
SO Cholet players
Stade Lavallois players
R. Charleroi S.C. players
Ligue 2 players
Championnat National players
Championnat National 3 players
French expatriates in Belgium
Expatriate footballers in Belgium